The Viru Infantry Battalion is a battalion of the Estonian Land Forces. It is a part of the 1st Infantry Brigade and its primary task is to train conscription-based infantry and anti-tank units. The battalion has been previously known as the 4th Infantry Regiment and as the 4th Single Infantry Battalion. The battalion is currently based at Jõhvi.

History

Formation
On 6 December 1917, Lieutenant colonel Jaan Soots, acting commander of the 1st Division, ordered Captain Hendrik Vahtramäe to form the 4th Infantry Regiment in Rakvere. Following the occupation of Estonia by the German Empire, the 4th Infantry Regiment was disbanded on 5 April 1918. After the German occupation ended, the unit was re-established in Narva on 21 November 1918.

Estonian War of Independence
On 28 November 1918, the 6th Division of the Red Army attacked the positions of the 4th Infantry Regiment at Narva. The regiment had just 595 men in 2 battalions, and together with few hundred Estonian Defence League members, the regiment was forced to leave Narva and retreat west. On 4 January 1919, units of 4th Infantry Regiment managed to stop the advancing Red Army at Valkla. The regiment took part in the following counter-offensive and liberated Narva on 19 January 1919. By the end of the war, the regiment had 53 officers, and 1476 NCOs and soldiers in its ranks, and was commanded by Colonel Jakob Vende.

1920–1940
After demobilization the unit was renamed 4th Single Infantry Battalion, and was based at Narva-Jõesuu. On 1 April 1924, the battalion was added to the 5th Infantry Regiment at Narva. On 1 October 1928, most units of 4th Single Infantry Battalion were moved to Jõhvi and Kurtna, while one infantry and one machine gun platoon took positions at Vasknarva. After the Soviet occupation in 1940 the battalion was disbanded.

1992–present
On 22 May 1992, the unit was restored as Viru Infantry Battalion in Jõhvi. The battalion participates in training conscripts for mechanized infantry and anti-tank units. The battalion is currently equipped with MILAN 2, FGM-148 Javelin anti-tank missiles and Patria Pasi XA-188 APCs.

Current structure
Viru Infantry Battalion:

 Battalion Headquarters
 1st Training Company
 2nd Training Company
 3rd Training Company
 Staff and Combat Service Support Company

List of commanders
Hendrik Vahtramäe 1917–1918
Aleksander Seimann 1918–1919
Jakob Vende 1919–1928
Voldemar Koch 1928–1934
August Tomander 1934–1940
Peeter Prans 1992–1993
Indrek Sirel 1993–1996
Jüri Järveläinen 1996–2004
Neeme Kaarna 2004–2006
Urmet Reimann 2006–2010
Janno Märk 2010–2012
Eero Kinnunen 2013–2015
Arno Kruusmann 2015–2019
Tarvo Luga 2019-2022
Viljar Laaneste 2022-present

See also
1st Infantry Brigade

References

External links
Official website

Battalions of Estonia
Military units and formations established in 1917
1917 establishments in Estonia
Military units and formations disestablished in 1940
Military units and formations established in 1992
1992 establishments in Estonia